Veintitantos is a Mexican magazine that was first published on June 1994. It has features on relationships, work, sex and other issues that appeal to women ages 18 to 25. The magazine is published monthly by Editorial Notmusa, S.A. DE C.V. The headquarters is in Mexico City.

When the magazine was first released, its price was 6.00 pesos (around US$2.00 in June 1994). After 1994's great Mexican crisis, the magazine tried its best to keep price and quality at the same level but could not manage to do it. 10 years later, you can buy Veintitantos magazine for 29 pesos (around US$2.8 in 2007).

References

External links 
 Veintitantos Official Web Site
 Editorial Notmusa Web Site
 Veintitantos magazine cover archive

1994 establishments in Mexico
Magazines established in 1994
Magazines published in Mexico
Mass media in Mexico City
Monthly magazines published in Mexico
Spanish-language magazines
Women's fashion magazines
Women's magazines
Youth magazines